The Chicago Circle Chikas football team represented the University of Illinois at Congress Circle (UICC) (now known as the University of Illinois Chicago) from the 1965 through 1973 season. Between 1950 through 1964, UICC was known as  University of Illinois Chicago Undergraduate Division located at Navy Pier, and competed as a junior college. Known as the Chicago Illini during their years competing at Navy Pier, with the move to their new campus, the athletic teams were inspired by the Chickasaw and renamed Chikas. UICC played its home games at multiple stadiums throughout their history with the most recent being Soldier Field. The Chikas program was dropped by the University at the conclusion of their 1973 season.

Strnad era (1965–1968)
George Strnad (January 8, 1928 – January 10, 2017) served as head coach of the Chikas from 1964 to 1968, and played as a member of the first team at Navy Pier in 1950. During his tenure as head coach after becoming a four-year school, the Chikas compiled an overall record of 13 wins, 18 losses, and one tie ( winning percentage).

1965

The 1965 Chicago Circle Chikas football team was an American football team that represented the University of Illinois at Congress Circle (UICC) (now known as the University of Illinois Chicago) as a member of the Gateway Conference during the 1965 NAIA football season. In their second season under head coach George Strnad, UICC compiled a 1–7 record. 

After losing three consecutive games to open the season, the Chikas defeated Eureka College for their only win of the season. Their 47–6 loss against Northwestern College late in the season clinched the 1965 Gateway Conference championship for the Trojans.

1966

The 1966 Chicago Circle Chikas football team was an American football team that represented the University of Illinois at Congress Circle (UICC) (now known as the University of Illinois Chicago) as a member of the Gateway Conference during the 1966 NAIA football season. In their third season under head coach George Strnad, UICC compiled a 3–4 record.

The 1966 season featured the first Chikas game played at Soldier Field where they defeated Lakeland College 20–17 on homecoming.

1967

The 1967 Chicago Circle Chikas football team was an American football team that represented the University of Illinois at Congress Circle (UICC) (now known as the University of Illinois Chicago) as an independent during the 1967 NAIA football season. In their fourth season under head coach George Strnad, UICC compiled a 5–3–1 record.

For the 1967 season, the Chikas played their four home games at four different facilities: Winnemac Park, Gately Stadium, Soldier Field, and Hanson Park. As UICC did not have an on-campus facility, playing in four stadiums across Chicago was viewed as a means to grow the profile of the fledgling program Their 5–3–1 record for the season marked the first and only winning season for the Chikas as a four-year school.

1968

The 1968 Chicago Circle Chikas football team was an American football team that represented the University of Illinois at Congress Circle (UICC) (now known as the University of Illinois Chicago) as an independent during the 1968 NAIA football season. In their final season under head coach George Strnad, UICC compiled a 4–4 record. 

In their game against Wayne State, the Tartars linebacker Ron Solack sustained a double-puncture to his intestine that resulted in his death on October 25.

Nemoto era (1969–1973)
Harold Nemoto (May 20, 1930 – October 4, 2005) was named as head coach of the Chikas in July 1969 to replace George Strnad. Nemoto previously spent 12 years as an assistant coach at Circle/Navy Pier, and was considered the best lineman to ever play at the University as a student in the 1950s. During his tenure as head coach, the Chikas compiled an overall record of 3 wins and 37 losses ( winning percentage).

1969

The 1969 Chicago Circle Chikas football team was an American football team that represented the University of Illinois at Congress Circle (UICC) (now known as the University of Illinois Chicago) as an independent during the 1969 NAIA football season. In their first season under head coach Harold Nemoto, UICC compiled a 1–7 record.

1970

The 1970 Chicago Circle Chikas football team was an American football team that represented the University of Illinois at Congress Circle (UICC) (now known as the University of Illinois Chicago) as an independent during the 1970 NAIA Division II football season. In their third season under head coach Harold Nemoto, UICC compiled an 0–8 record.

1971

The 1971 Chicago Circle Chikas football team was an American football team that represented the University of Illinois at Congress Circle (UICC) (now known as the University of Illinois Chicago) as an independent during the 1971 NAIA Division II football season. In their third season under head coach Harold Nemoto, UICC compiled a 2–6 record.

1972

The 1972 Chicago Circle Chikas football team was an American football team that represented the University of Illinois at Congress Circle (UICC) (now known as the University of Illinois Chicago) as an independent during the 1972 NAIA Division II football season. In their fourth season under head coach Harold Nemoto, UICC compiled an 0–8 record.

1973

The 1973 Chicago Circle Chikas football team was an American football team that represented the University of Illinois at Congress Circle (UICC) (now known as the University of Illinois Chicago) as an independent during the 1973 NCAA Division III football season. In their final season under head coach Harold Nemoto, UICC compiled an 0–8 record.

In early November the University stated the Chikas football program was to be dropped by the university at the conclusion of the season.

Notes

References

External links
 Intercollegiate football at the University of Illinois at Chicago from the University of Illinois at Chicago University Library

American football teams established in 1950
American football teams disestablished in 1973
1950 establishments in Illinois
1973 disestablishments in Illinois